TSV 1861 Giants Nördlingen is a basketball club based in Nördlingen, Germany. The club currently plays in the ProB, the German third highest league.

Trophies
2. Basketball Bundesliga (1):
2007–08

Results

Notable players

External links
Team profile at eurobasket.com 

Basketball teams in Germany
Nördlingen